Simone-Marie Plé-Caussade (14 August 1897, Paris – 6 August 1986, Bagnères-de-Bigorre) was a French music pedagogue, composer and pianist. She wrote mainly works for solo piano and organ in addition to choral works, songs, chamber music, and sacred music. She notably published two volumes of piano music for children.
 
Plé-Caussade was married to composer Georges Caussade, 24 years her senior, who had been one of her teachers at the Conservatoire de Paris. Her other professors at the conservatoire included Alfred Cortot and Henri Dallier. She succeeded her husband as professor of fugue at the Paris Conservatoire in 1928. Her notable students included Gilbert Amy, Marc Bleuse, Antoine Bouchard, Herbert de Castro, Monic Cecconi-Botella, Pierre Gabaye, Betsy Jolas, Noël Lancien, Jean-Etienne Marie, Bruce Mather, Serge Nigg, Tolia Nikiprowetzky, Jean-Louis Petit, Makoto Shinohara, Georges-Émile Tanguay, and Serge Gut. 

1897 births
1986 deaths
20th-century French composers
20th-century women composers
20th-century French women classical pianists
French music educators
Musicians from Paris
Academic staff of the Conservatoire de Paris
Conservatoire de Paris alumni
Women music educators